Volodymyr Mykolayovych Troshkin (28 September 1947 – 5 July 2020) was a Ukrainian footballer and coach. He was considered by many to be the best right back in 1970s in Ukraine (Ukrainian SSR). He was born in Yenakiieve.

Following retirement from playing and coaching career, Troshkin worked as a football functionary in the Ukrainian Association of Football (FFU/UAF) and the Ukrainian Association of Football Veterans. In Ukrainian Association of Football he headed a committee on players' status and transfers.

Career
He started his professional playing career in Industriya Yenakiieve (today FC Pivdenstal Yenakiieve) in mid 1960s that participated in football competitions of the Soviet Class B (third tier).

In 1968–1969 Troshkin served his "obligatory military duty" (see conscription in the Soviet Union) in SKA Kyiv that played in the Soviet Class A Second Group (second tier).

In 1969 he joined FC Dynamo Kyiv that was coached by Viktor Maslov.

International career
He earned 31 caps for the USSR national football team, and participated in UEFA Euro 1972. He also won a bronze medal in football at the 1976 Summer Olympics.

Honours
 Soviet Top League winner: 1971, 1974, 1975, 1977
 Soviet Cup winner: 1974
 UEFA Cup Winners' Cup winner: 1974–75
 UEFA Super Cup winner: 1975
 European Football Championship runner-up: 1972
 Olympic bronze medal: 1976

References

External links
 Profile 

1947 births
2020 deaths
People from Yenakiieve
Ukrainian footballers
Soviet footballers
Soviet Union international footballers
UEFA Euro 1972 players
FC Pivdenstal Yenakiyeve players
SKA Kiev players
FC Dynamo Kyiv players
FC Dnipro players
Olympic footballers of the Soviet Union
Footballers at the 1976 Summer Olympics
Olympic bronze medalists for the Soviet Union
Soviet football managers
Ukrainian football managers
SKA Kiev managers
NK Veres Rivne managers
Olympic medalists in football
Soviet Top League players
Medalists at the 1976 Summer Olympics
Association football midfielders
Sportspeople from Donetsk Oblast